The 2016 Ukrainian Super Cup became the thirteenth edition of Ukrainian Super Cup, an annual football match contested by the winners of the previous season's Ukrainian Top League and Ukrainian Cup competitions.

The match was played at the Chornomorets Stadium, Odesa, on 16 July 2016, and contested by league winner Dynamo Kyiv and cup winner Shakhtar Donetsk. Shakhtar won it on penalty shootout.

Match

Details

2016
2016–17 in Ukrainian football
FC Dynamo Kyiv matches
FC Shakhtar Donetsk matches
Sport in Odesa
Ukrainian Supercup 2016